Frederick John Herting (born 25 February 1940) played first-class cricket for Somerset in 1960. He was born at South Ruislip, Middlesex.

Herting was a lower-order right-handed batsman and a left-arm fast-medium bowler. He played a lot of cricket for Somerset's second eleven in the Minor Counties Championship and the Second Eleven Championship from 1956, but his first-class career was restricted to just five matches in mid-season in 1960. In the first of these, against Gloucestershire at Bath, he took four first-innings wickets for 85 runs. But in his four other matches he took only three further wickets, and he did not play for Somerset again after the 1960 season.

References

1940 births
Living people
English cricketers
Somerset cricketers